Projapyx is a genus of diplurans in the family Projapygidae.

Species
 Projapyx brasiliensis Silvestri, 1938
 Projapyx congruens Silvestri, 1938
 Projapyx eburneus (Paulian & Delamare-Deboutteville, 1948)
 Projapyx imperfectus Pagés, 1958
 Projapyx incomprehensus Silvestri, 1909
 Projapyx jeanneli Delamare-Deboutteville, 1947
 Projapyx stylifer Cook, 1899

References

Diplura